Salil Shetty (born 3 February 1961) is an Indian human rights activist who was the Secretary General of the human rights organization Amnesty International (2010–2018) till 31 July 2018. His tenure at Amnesty International was marred by significant controversy surrounding the organization's Global Transition Programme and the prevalence of a toxic workplace culture, which was later found to have contributed to the suicide of employee Gaetan Mootoo. Previously, he was the director of the United Nations Millennium Campaign. Before joining the UN, he served as the Chief Executive of ActionAid. In September, 2021, Shetty will become the Vice President of Global Programs at the Open Society Foundations.

In recognition of his long-term commitment to Human Rights and his deep understanding of the complexities of human rights issues, Shetty was appointed a Senior Fellow at the Harvard Kennedy School's Carr Center for Human Rights for the academic year 2018–2019.

Shetty is also affiliated to Harvard University's Lakshmi Mittal and Family South Asia Institute for the academic year 2018–2019.  Affiliates contribute to the academic study of South Asia by bringing their expertise on a wide range of issues to Harvard University.

Early life and education
Shetty grew up in Bangalore. His late mother, Hemlatha Shetty, was active in women's groups and his father, V.T. Rajshekar, was active with the Dalit movement. Growing up in India in the tumultuous 1970s, he lived through the 1976 state of emergency which led to human rights being curtailed and an intense level of activism. He did his schooling from St. Joseph's Indian High School, Bangalore. He received a BCom in Advanced Accounting from St. Joseph's College of Commerce in 1981, an MBA in 1983 from the Indian Institute of Management Ahmedabad, and an MSc in Social Policy and Planning from the London School of Economics in 1991 with distinction.

Early career 
In 1983, Salil Shetty was hired from IIM-A by Azim Premji and began working for the Indian IT company Wipro.

ActionAid 
Following this, Shetty joined ActionAid, one of the world's most respected international development NGOs, rising up to head ActionAid's operations in India and later Kenya in East Africa.  Shetty was the first person from the global south to be appointed as the Chief Executive of ActionAid, 1998- 2003. Salil Shetty is credited with not just transforming ActionAid into a Southern-led International organisation, moving its global headquarters from London to Johannesburg in South Africa, but set off an important new trend in global development organisations to become more participatory and bottom up in their approach.  The most recent major global organisation to move in this direction is Oxfam which has moved its headquarters to Nairobi, with an African woman CEO.

The move initiated by Salil Shetty enable ActionAid to work towards giving all its different country programmes a more equal say in how the organisation works. The new structure made ActionAid's commitment to accountability to the people, communities and countries it worked with a reality, and therefore making it more effective in fighting and eradicating poverty. In line with Shetty's commitment to making ActionAid a truly international organisation, during his tenure as Chief Executive regional programmes and policy advocacy offices were established in Bangkok, Harare, Brussels and Washington DC.

UN Millennium Campaign 
Given his significant achievements at ActionAid, Shetty was then appointed the Director of the United Nations Millennium Campaign from 2003 till 2010. The UN Millennium Campaign was established by UN Secretary General Kofi Annan in 2002. The Campaign supported citizens' efforts to hold their governments to account for the achievement of the Millennium Development Goals (MDG's). Under Salil Shetty's leadership the campaign for the MDGs reached over a hundred countries across the globe and the MDGs gained a great deal of traction among decision makers and citizens alike.

In 2005, citizens groups, including NGOs, faith groups, trade unions, supported by the Millennium Campaign, mobilised for the MDGS/‘Make Poverty History’ campaign to increase awareness and pressuring governments into taking actions towards relieving absolute poverty. The campaign focused on the responsibility of developed countries, especially the G8 and European Union. The three focus areas for change were trade, debt and aid. Mass mobilisations were seen in the United Kingdom, Australia, Canada, Norway and other developed countries.

The UN Millennium Campaign, under the leadership of Salil Shetty, also helped aggregate the various national campaigns into The Global Call to Action Against Poverty GCAP). GCAP is an alliance that brings together trade unions, international non-governmental organisations, the women's and youth movements, community and faith groups and others to call for action from world leaders in the global North and South to meet their promises to end poverty and inequality. GCAP added to existing campaigning on poverty by forming diverse, inclusive national platforms that are able to open up civil society space and advocate more effectively than individual organisations would be able to do on their own. It also organised global mass mobilisations that expressed solidarity between the global North and South, allowed tens of millions of ordinary people to make their voices heard.

An innovative mass action launched by the UN Millennium Campaign was the Stand Up initiative. On 16 October 2006, millions of people around the world joined together to 'Stand Up against Poverty' – an effort to remind governments that they must keep their promises to achieve the Millennium Development Goals and eradicate extreme poverty. Stand Up against Poverty, is also officially recognized in the Guinness World Record for the "greatest number of people to stand up for a given cause, at multiple locations, within 24 hours." Stand Up campaigns were held around the world by people of all ages, races and religions. Since 2006, the UN Millennium Campaign organized record breaking Stand Up events annually around the world, to campaign for the MDGs.

Amnesty International 
Shetty was appointed as Secretary General of the human rights organization Amnesty International from July 2010. The role involved being chief strategist, advocate and spokesperson for the global Amnesty movement and Chief Executive of the International Secretariat.

During his tenure at Amnesty, Salil Shetty traveled extensively, visiting over 70 countries, meeting grassroots activists, political leaders and members of the media, as well as those on whose behalf Amnesty International campaigns.  This has included visits to Egypt in the aftermath of the 2011 uprisings and to Australia to campaign for the rights of indigenous people. He also represented Amnesty International at major meetings at the UN, the World Economic Forum and led the organisation's show of solidarity in Oslo for the imprisoned Nobel Peace Prize Laureate Liu Xiaobo calling on the Chinese authorities to improve their human rights record.
Shetty was also instrumental in establishing the Secretary General's Global Council, which was established to help raise public support and financial resources to fuel Amnesty International's expansion in Africa, Asia, Latin America, and the Middle East. The goal of the Global Council is to raise financial resources and support for projects connected to Amnesty International's Strategic Goals 2016-2019. These goals seek to address the rising inequality the world is facing, increasing movement of people within and across borders, ongoing crises and conflicts, unlawful actions by states in the name of public order and ending terrorism. Salil Shetty invited Sir Richard Branson to co-Chair the Council which had leading human rights supporters from the world of art, business and philanthropy including Paulo Coelho, Yoko Ono, Tony Fernandes, Hadeel Ibrahim, Bassim Haidar and Krishna Rao.

As Secretary General, Salil Shetty revived Art for Amnesty and the Ambassador of Conscience Award, Amnesty International's highest honour that recognizes remarkable individuals and groups who have promoted and enhanced the cause of human rights by acting on their conscience, confronting injustice and using their talents to inspire others.

After completing two terms of four years each, Salil Shetty decided to step down as Secretary General in July 2018.

Global Transition Programme 
As Secretary General, Salil Shetty led a major change process to transform Amnesty International from being a predominantly European organisation to a truly global people's movement for human rights. This Global Transition Programme (GTP) to move Amnesty "closer to the ground" represented a significant organizational change for Amnesty: it set up Regional Offices across the globe in 11 locations, hired the vast majority of its staff and leaders from the global south. The change process also focused on strengthening the integration across segments and functions within the organization and strengthening Amnesty's national chapters/sections, particularly in the South.

Amnesty also aimed to increase its supporters and activists in the global South, while diversifying its institutional sources of funding.  The change process was aimed to lead to "Amnesty having significantly greater impact by becoming a more global movement" and to result in "acting with greater legitimacy, speed, capacity and relevance as we stand alongside those whose rights are violated". New national offices were set up in India, Brazil, Nigeria, Indonesia, South Africa and Kenya in 2012.

An independent study conducted by the Transnational NGO Initiative housed at Syracuse University on the Global Transition programme observed that the Global Transition Programme had resulted in only a modest increase in the human rights impact of Amnesty's work. The report also found that Amnesty's visibility in national and regionally salient media and localities and languages was somewhat enhanced, while its credibility among the general public and other stakeholders was generally thought to have improved as a result of the GTP. GTP also contributed to Amnesty's supportership growth strategy through the increase of supporters in a few selected countries such as India.

Decentralisation controversy and staff suicides 

The decentralisation of Amnesty International's international secretariat, led by Shetty, caused a serious dispute amongst the organisation's staff. According to an article published by the Guardian on 2 December 2012, staff objected to leadership reneging on long-standing terms and conditions, including severance, immediately prior to initiating job cuts, resulting in the first ever vote to strike by the organisation's employees.
The British newspaper The Observer, where Amnesty International's founder launched the organization in 1961, characterized the situation caused by Shetty's sacking of staff working on core issues such as women's rights and the death penalty: "Amnesty was one of 20th-century Britain's greatest gifts to the world. Now it is a wreck."On 25 May 2018, Amnesty International's West Africa researcher, Gaëtan Mootoo, was found dead in the organization's offices in Paris. Five weeks later, Roz McGregor, a paid intern in Amnesty International's Geneva office, committed suicide in an apparently unrelated incident. Shetty stood down as Secretary General in July 2018 shortly after the deaths. The friends and families of both employees cited concerns about Amnesty's organizational culture as contributing factors in their deaths, leading the organization to order two independent inquiries. The first, carried out by the KonTerra Group was tasked with investigating Amnesty's workplace culture and the wellbeing of its employees, while the second examined the circumstances of Gaetan Mootoo's death and was conducted by James Laddie QC. Both reports were highly critical of Amnesty International's senior leadership. In particular, the KonTerra Group report found that "bullying and public humiliation was used as a management tool" and that the "management-related issues observed went well beyond normal failures of effective management in high pressure contexts". The report concluded that "senior staff bear responsibility for the toxic culture that currently exists. Staff fear senior leadership [...] many individuals feel overwhelmed, underappreciated and generally miserable".

Open Society Foundations 
On June 9, 2021 it was announced that Shetty would become the Vice President of Global Programs at the Open Society Foundations on September 1, 2021.

Awards 
On 2 February 2012, Salil Shetty received an honorary degree from University Catholic of Louvain (UCL) on behalf of Amnesty International.

In 2014, Salil Shetty given the 'Public Servant of the Year' award by the prestigious Asian Awards in London. The Asian Awards is the only event that pays tribute to Asian success across all walks of life; emphasising inspiring achievements and highlighting inspirational role models in the fields of business, sport, entertainment, philanthropy and popular arts and culture.

In June 2018, Shetty was awarded the Stardust Achievers Award for Excellence in Humanitarian Service. The Stardust Achievers Awards honours Indian achievers from diverse fields in the UK.

Boards and Other Engagements 

 Steward, World Economic Forum System Initiative on Future of Digital Economy & Society (2016)
 Trustee, International Civil Society Centre, Berlin (2014)
 Advisory Council, American India Foundation, New York, 2010
 Governor, The Institute of Development Studies, Sussex (2005)
 Council Member, The Overseas Development Institute, London (2005)
 Member of the Joint Facilitation Committee of the Civil Society Forum of the World Bank, representing ActionAid (2005)

Notes

External links

 Press release, Amnesty International
 Riz Khan - Making human rights universal - interview with Salil Shetty on Al Jazeera English
 Salil Shetty keynote speech at Wikimania 2014

1961 births
Living people
Amnesty International people
Tulu people
Indian officials of the United Nations
People from Bangalore
Indian human rights activists
Activists from Karnataka
Dalit activists
20th-century Indian people